Liu Qi may refer to:

 Emperor Jing of Han (188 BC – 141 BC), personal name Liu Qi, 6th emperor of the Western Han Dynasty
 Liu Qi (Liu Biao's son) (died 209), oldest son of Eastern Han Dynasty warlord Liu Biao
 Liu Qi (politician, born 1942), former mayor of Beijing and president of Beijing Organizing Committee during the 2008 Summer Olympics
 Liu Qi (politician, born 1957), politician and current party chief of Jiangxi province
 Liu Qi (ski jumper) (born 1996), Chinese ski jumper